Albergue de Niños de Ponce (Ponce Shelter for Boys) was a shelter for orphan boys originally located in Barrio Canas Urbano in Ponce, Puerto Rico, and later moving to permanent quarters in Barrio Canas, also in Ponce.  The not-for-profit shelter operated from 1931 to around 1985.

Mission 
By 1931, when the shelter opened, the city of Ponce already offered facilities for the blind ("Asilo de Ciegos de Ponce"), the elderly poor ("Asilo de Mendigos de Ponce") and the homeless ("Asilo de Huérfanos de Ponce"). In addition, it also had a shelter for the mentally-incapacitated ("Asilo de Locos"). However, it had no shelter for orphan boys. Albergue de Niños de Ponce filled this need. The shelter's mission was to provide shelter for homeless orphan children.

History 
Juan Luis Boscio (1896 - 1980), a local businessman and later mayor of Ponce (1961 - 1964), was one of the founders of the Albergue de Niños de Ponce. The shelter was founded in 1931 on the north side of Calle Villa in Barrio Canas, between Calle Cementerio Civil and Calle Central.  Albergue de Niños later moved to the a new masonry structure located on the south side of Calle Villa, between Escuela Jaime L. Drew, and PR-500.  Among its directors was Jaime L. Drew, a prominent educator from Ponce. 

Today 
A local non-profit foundation, the Ivan Ayala Kidz Cancer Foundation, is currently (2019) looking to use the former Albergue de Niños building on Calle Villa Final as a hospital for children with cancer, and affiliate it to St. Jude Children's Research Hospital. Construction of the Steven Anthony Children’s Hospital started on 16 November 2019.

See also

Timeline of Ponce, Puerto Rico
History of Puerto Rico

References

Organizations established in 1931
Organizations based in Ponce, Puerto Rico
1931 establishments in Puerto Rico
Non-profit organizations based in Puerto Rico
Buildings and structures in Ponce, Puerto Rico